Pilots' Almanac is a 1988 role-playing game supplement for HârnMaster published by Columbia Games.

Contents
Pilots' Almanac is a supplement in which supplemental rules and info deal with ship movement, navigation, and weather.

Publication history
The Pilots' Almanac was written by N. Robin Crossby and Tom Dalgliesh, with art by Eric Hotz, and was published by Columbia Games in 1988 as a 64-page book with four center-bound color maps.

Shannon Appelcline explained that by 1988 Columbia Games began directing their attention towards product lines other than Harn: "That began when Columbia shifted their focus toward supporting their new Hârnmaster RPG, rather than playing to their strengths and supporting the setting of Hârn. Thus the first ever Hârn adventures appeared, 100 Bushels of Rye (1988) and The Staff of Fanon (1988), as well as the rules-oriented Pilots' Almanac (1988). They were followed by a series of magic books and other RPG supplements."

Reception
Jake Thornton reviewed Pilots' Almanac for Games International magazine, and gave it 4 1/2 stars out of 5, and stated that "To make full use of this product you need to understand the Harnmaster skill system. If you do, then buy it."

References

Hârn supplements
Role-playing game supplements introduced in 1988